I Wake Up Screaming (originally titled Hot Spot) is a 1941 film noir. It is based on the novel of the same name by Steve Fisher, adapted by Dwight Taylor. The film stars Betty Grable, Victor Mature and Carole Landis, and features one of Grable's few dramatic roles.

Plot
The story proceeds largely through a series of flashbacks, beginning with New York sports promoter Frankie Christopher being interrogated at a police station about the murder of a young actress, Vicky Lynn.  Christopher recounts first meeting Vicky as a waitress at a restaurant when he was there with two friends, fading actor Robin Ray and gossip columnist Larry Evans.  Christopher takes up a dare from his friends to turn Vicky into a star with their help.

Christopher succeeds, but Vicky betrays him by signing with a Hollywood producer.  At the apartment she shares with her sister Jill, she finally tells Christopher she is leaving him while she is packing.  Christopher reacts angrily, and the next morning Jill returns to the apartment to find her sister dead with Christopher standing by her body.

Not having enough evidence to hold Christopher for the murder, detective Ed Cornell lets him go, but is absolutely certain of Christopher's guilt and vows to bring him to justice.  Hounded by Cornell, who abuses his power, entering Christopher's home and other residences without warrants, Christopher turns to Jill, who had not liked him very much but does not think that he could have killed her sister.

As Jill and Frankie begin to fall in love, they follow Vicky's previous movements and encounters to find the real killer.  Eventually, they conclude that she had been killed by the apartment building's front desk manager, Harry Williams. Williams admits to the crime, but also tells Frankie that Cornell already knew of his guilt. Christopher, with the police close behind, goes to Cornell's apartment, which he discovers is plastered with posters of Vicky, leading to a final confrontation in which Cornell admits to trying frame Christopher, due to jealousy over Vicky.

Cast
 Betty Grable as Jill Lynn
 Victor Mature as Frankie Christopher
 Carole Landis as Vicky Lynn
 Laird Cregar as Ed Cornell
 Alan Mowbray as Robin Ray
 Allyn Joslyn as Larry Evans
 Elisha Cook, Jr. as Harry Williams
 Chick Chandler as Reporter
 Cyril Ring as Reporter
 Morris Ankrum as Asst. District Attorney
 Charles Lane as Mr. Keating, Florist
 Frank Orth as Caretaker
 Gregory Gaye as Headwaiter
 May Beatty as Mrs. Handel
 Stanley Blystone as Detective (uncredited)
 Heinie Conklin as Pedestrian (uncredited)

Background
The movie was originally titled I Wake Up Screaming before its title was changed to Hot Spot and then back to I Wake Up Screaming, although it was released in some markets as Hot Spot. It was Mature's first film under his contract with 20th Century Fox. Alice Faye was originally cast as Jill but was replaced by Betty Grable.

I Wake Up Screaming was rumored to be the first Hollywood picture for French actor Jean Gabin, but he first had to learn English, which conflicted with the shooting schedule.

The film was remade in 1953 as Vicki.

Reception

Box office
The film earned a profit of $574,100.

Critical response
Film critic Dennis Schwartz gave the film a favorable review, writing, "Veteran Fox studio director H. Bruce Humberstone (Charlie Chan at the Opera / Sun Valley Serenade), whose films ranged from Charlie Chan to Tarzan, puts forth his best effort in this thrilling film noir. I Wake Up Screaming was remade in 1953 as Vicki. Dwight Taylor bases his screenplay on the book by pulp writer Steve Fisher. In a jarring move that works in an odd way, 'Somewhere Over the Rainbow' is the soundtrack that can be heard throughout. This early film noir, shot in a naturalistic style, showed how dark photography can increase a brooding mood and make the film more tense... The conclusion is filled with plot twists and surprise character revelations, as the marvelously sinister performance by Laird Cregar as the sicko detective dominates the screen."

Music
The film's score contained "Over the Rainbow" and the theme from the 1931 film Street Scene, written by Alfred Newman. Also heard in the background is "These Are the Things I Love", written by Harold Barlow and Lewis Harris, which became a popular ballad during the big-band era.

References

External links
 
 
 
 
 I Wake Up Screaming informational site and DVD review at DVD Beaver (including images)
 

1941 films
1940s crime thriller films
1940s mystery thriller films
20th Century Fox films
American black-and-white films
American crime thriller films
American mystery thriller films
1940s English-language films
Film noir
Films based on American novels
Films based on mystery novels
Films directed by H. Bruce Humberstone
Films scored by Cyril J. Mockridge
1940s American films